Too Romantic is a 1992 dramatic short film that Todd Field created while a fellow at the AFI Conservatory. It was his directorial debut. It is a dramatic piece about a fifteen-year-old boy taking a road trip with his recently widowed grandmother. The piece is notable in that it was Field's first project as a writer/director and his first introduction to many of the collaborators he continued to work with on subsequent projects, including his Academy Award-nominated  features In the Bedroom and Little Children.

Premise
Too Romantic is about a fifteen-year-old boy taking a road trip with his recently widowed grandmother.

Cast
Sean Murray as Tim 
Mab Ashforth as Goose 
Glen Vernon as Barney 
Dorothy Blass as Lil 
Scott Adair as Bell Man 
Allison Duboise as Waitress 
Alida P. Field as Swan Girl

Crew
Film Editor, Barry Silver
Cinematographer Dave Perkal
Written and directed by Todd Field

References

External links
 

1992 films
1992 short films
Films directed by Todd Field
American student films
1990s English-language films